The 1900 Sewanee Tigers football team represented the Sewanee Tigers of Sewanee: The University of the South in the 1900 Southern Intercollegiate Athletic Association football season.  The loss to Virginia was the first loss since 1897. The team claims an SIAA title.

Schedule

Players

Varsity lettermen

Line

Backfield

Subs

References

Sewanee
Sewanee Tigers football seasons
Sewanee Tigers football